Whistleblowers Australia Inc. is an association for those who have exposed corruption or any form of malpractice, especially if they were then hindered or abused, and for those who are thinking of exposing it, or who wish to support those who are doing so. The organisation began as Whistleblowers Anonymous in 1991.

Whistleblowers Australia Inc. is an association of self-help and mutual help campaigns. The organisation has its own constitution. There are quarterly newsletters of 'The Whistle' available. There is also a sister website.

Publications
There is a variety of publications that describe these activities, including Whistleblowers Stories, Reference Books and Reports.

Standards, policies and procedures
The organisation can provide information in the form of guides from various governments, statutory organisations and ethics organisations that relate to whistle-blowing.

Legislation

There is legislation governing whistle-blowing in both private sector and public sector employment, at Commonwealth and various State and Territory levels.

Civil Law Remedies
In Australia there exists a variety of remedies to retaliation shown to whistle-blowers in common law, state and federal statutes.

Former Presidents
Jean Lennane, 1993-1995
Brian Martin, 1996-1999
Jean Lennane, 2000-2006 
Peter Bennett, 2006-2010
Cynthia Kardell, 2010-

See also

List of whistleblowers

References

External links
Whistleblowers Australia
ACAC – Our Mission | Shining a light on moral and legal corruption to ensure organizations and individuals act in the best interests of Canadians
The National Whistleblower Center (NWC) - Protecting Whistleblowers
The Teachers Are Blowing Their Whistles!
Corruption Prevention Network Queensland

Whistleblower support organizations
Whistleblowing in Australia
Non-profit organisations based in New South Wales
Organizations established in 1991
1991 establishments in Australia